James Bailey Chaplin (July 13, 1905 – March 25, 1939), nicknamed Tiny Chaplin, was an American professional baseball player. He played in Major League Baseball as a right-handed pitcher. He played four seasons with the New York Giants (1928, 1930–31) and the Boston Bees (1936). Chaplin died in an auto accident in National City, California on March 25, 1939.

See also 

 Florida Gators
 List of Florida Gators baseball players

References

External links 

1905 births
1939 deaths
Baltimore Orioles (IL) players
Baseball players from Los Angeles
Boston Bees players
Florida Gators baseball players
Florida Gators football players
Jersey City Skeeters players
Major League Baseball pitchers
Minneapolis Millers (baseball) players
Nashville Vols players
New York Giants (NL) players
Road incident deaths in California
San Antonio Indians players
San Diego Padres (minor league) players
Springfield Ponies players